Arichanna melanaria is a species of moth of the  family Geometridae. It is found over most of Europe (except Great Britain, the Benelux, the Iberian Peninsula, Italy and Greece), Mongolia, east to Japan.

The wingspan is 36–42 mm. Adults are on wing from June to September depending on the location.

The larvae feed on the leaves of Vaccinium uliginosum, Vaccinium oxycoccos and Rhododendron tomentosum.

External links

www.lepiforum.de
www.schmetterlinge-deutschlands.de

Boarmiini
Moths of Asia
Moths of Europe
Taxa named by Carl Linnaeus
Moths described in 1758